Memorial Branch is a branch library of the Los Angeles Public Library.  It was built in 1930 based on a Gothic Revival design by architect John C. Austin, also noted as the lead architect of the Griffith Observatory and the Hollywood Masonic Temple.  The library includes a large heraldic work of stained glass created by the artists at Judson Studios.

In 1987, the Memorial Branch and several other branch libraries in Los Angeles were added to the National Register of Historic Places as part of a thematic group submission.  The application noted that the branch libraries had been constructed in a variety of period revival styles to house the initial branch library system of the City of Los Angeles. In the movie, Bedtime Stories, starring Adam Sandler, this library serves as the children's elementary school.

The Library underwent a major restoration in the mid-1990s, reopening in 1996. The library relocated to office space near John Burroughs Middle School in the interim.

See also
 National Register of Historic Places listings in Los Angeles
 List of Los Angeles Historic-Cultural Monuments in the Wilshire and Westlake areas
 Los Angeles Public Library

References

External links
 Carol Easton, "Library in the park," WESTWAYS, September 1977
 History of the Memorial Branch of the Los Angeles Public Library
 Letter, June 1930, from Judson Studios explaining Alumni memorial window

Library buildings completed in 1930
Libraries in Los Angeles
Libraries on the National Register of Historic Places in Los Angeles
Los Angeles Historic-Cultural Monuments
1930 in California
Gothic Revival architecture in California
Wilshire, Los Angeles